Scarpelli is an Italian surname. Notable people with the surname include:

Craig Scarpelli (born 1961), American soccer player
Furio Scarpelli (1919–2010), Italian screenwriter
Gerald Scarpelli (1938–1989), American mobster
Giacomo Scarpelli (born 1956), Italian historian and screenwriter
Glenn Scarpelli (born 1966), American actor and singer
Henry Scarpelli (1930–2010), American comics artist
Marco Scarpelli (1918–1995), Italian cinematographer
Mathieu Scarpelli (born 1981), French footballer
Umberto Scarpelli (1904–1980), Italian screenwriter and film director

Italian-language surnames